Wojciech Kędziora (born 20 December 1980) is a Polish footballer who currently plays for Piast II Gliwice.

Career

Club
At the beginning of his career he played for Sośnica Gliwice. In 2001, he moved to the Carbo Gliwice. Then he played four seasons in Piast Gliwice.

In June 2008, he joined Zagłębie Lubin. He was released from Zagłębie Lubin on 1 June 2011.

In July 2011, he joined Piast Gliwice.

On 30 July 2019, Kędziora signed with LKS Wilki Wilcza.

References

External links
 
 

Living people
Sportspeople from Gliwice
Association football forwards
Polish footballers
1980 births
Piast Gliwice players
Zagłębie Lubin players
Bruk-Bet Termalica Nieciecza players
Carbo Gliwice players
GKS Katowice players
Ruch Chorzów players
Ekstraklasa players